Tshuutheni Emvula (born October 19, 1981 in Berlin, Germany), sometimes known as Becoming Phill is a Namibian entrepreneur, hip hop record producer, DJ, composer, and video editor from Windhoek, Namibia. He has produced for various Namibian and international artists including Ricky Rick, Gazza, Black Vulcanite, Sunny Boy, TeQuila, Qonja, RUN N.A.M.S., Lize Ehlers, and Zeus.

He has composed music, conducted sound design and supervised soundtrack music placement for the Namibian films 100 Bucks, Love Is..., (won Best Director at Namibian Film Awards 2012), My Beautiful Nightmare, (won Best Independent Film at Luxor Film Festival Egypt 2012), Try, (won Best Film at Namibian Film Awards 2012), Eembwiti, Katutura (2015) and The Unseen (2016).

Becoming Phill has various production styles. He attributes his style to DJ Premier, Pete Rock and J Dilla and also musicians such as Kanye West, Brenda Fassie, Cameo, Osunlade and others.

Music career
Becoming Phill has been producing for over a decade, working with musicians across southern Africa and US. He began when his older sister gave him a copy of the then just released FruityLoops in 1998. He went on to work in a full studio environment becoming an understudy of French guitarist/producer, Christian Polloni, from 2005 until 2009. He is currently working on several other projects. In 2016, he released his first official solo album, Electrum.

Discography

Solo albums
 2009: Allsorts Vol. 1
 2016: Electrum

Production credits
 2004: Gazza: produced "KKN" from Zula II Survive 
 2005: Gazza: produced "Nobody" and "My Love" on Stof-Lap Chikapute
 2005: Hiphocalypse Mixtape various remixes 
 2007: TeQuila: produced, co-produced, arranged and mastered for Sound of My Heart
 2008: Sunny Boy: produced "Jaiva Mfanyana" on The Sleeping Giant
 2010: Run N.A.M.S.: produced The Mixtape Vol. 1
 2011: Lize Ehlers: produced the whole of African Cleavage
 2014: Pumpkinhead (billed as PH): produced tracks 1, 2 and 3 on This is Not a Tyler Perry Movie (2014)
 2014: Malkovich: produced tracks 4, 12, and 13 on Great Expectations
 2016: Riky Rick: produced the single "Spread Love"
 2016: Black Vulcanite: produced "Playing with Dolls" and "Smoov as a Mutha" from sophomore album, Black Colonists
 2017: Tha God Fahim featuring Mach-Hommy: produced backing track for "Chicken Milk Bomb" on The Dump Goat

References

External links
 BecomingPhill official website
 Becoming Phill on SoundCloud
 BecomingPhill on IMDb

1981 births
Living people
Musicians from Berlin
Namibian hip hop musicians
Musicians from Windhoek